This is a list of Dutch television related events from 1994.

Events
Unknown - Glennis Grace wins the tenth series of Soundmixshow, performing as Whitney Houston. She is the second Grand Final winner to portray the singer.

Debuts

International
30 October –  Budgie the Little Helicopter (Kindernet)

Television shows

1950s
NOS Journaal (1956–present)

1970s
Sesamstraat (1976–present)

1980s
Jeugdjournaal (1981–present)
Soundmixshow (1985-2002)
Het Klokhuis (1988–present)

1990s
Goede tijden, slechte tijden (1990–present)

Ending this year

Births

Deaths